The Edmonton Journal is a daily newspaper in Edmonton, Alberta. It is part of the Postmedia Network.

History
The Journal was founded in 1903 by three local businessmen — John Macpherson, Arthur Moore and J.W. Cunningham — as a rival to Alberta's first newspaper, the 23-year-old Edmonton Bulletin.  Within a week, the Journal took over another newspaper, The Edmonton Post, and established an editorial policy supporting the Conservative Party against the Bulletins stance for the Liberal Party. In 1912, the Journal was sold to the Southam family. It remained under Southam ownership until 1996, when it was acquired by Hollinger International. The Journal was subsequently sold to Canwest in 2000, and finally came under its current ownership, Postmedia Network Inc., in 2010.

In 1905, The Journal began operating from a building on the corner of a lot on 102nd Avenue and 101st Street. Its present location at 101st Street and 100th Avenue was established in 1921, and Alberta's first radio station, CJCA, began broadcasting from the building a year later.

In 1937, the Journal came into conflict with Alberta Premier William Aberhart's attempt to pass the Accurate News and Information Act requiring newspapers to print government rebuttals to stories the provincial cabinet deemed "inaccurate." After successfully fighting the law, the Journal became the first non-American newspaper to be honoured by the Pulitzer Prize committee, receiving a special bronze plaque in 1938 for defending the freedom of the press.

After the Bulletin folded in 1951, the Journal was left as Edmonton's oldest and only remaining daily newspaper. The monopoly continued until the Edmonton Sun began publishing in 1978.

In 1982, government officials under the Combines Investigation Act entered and searched the paper's offices under the suspicion that Southam Newspapers was violating federal legislation by engaging in unfair trading and anti-competitive business practices. The Alberta Court of Appeal ruled the search inconsistent with the Charter of Rights and Freedoms, a decision the Supreme Court of Canada upheld in Hunter v Southam Inc.

Present day
Today, the Journal publishes six days a week, with regular sections including News (city, Canada, and world), Sports, Opinion, A&E, Life, and Business. The newspaper participated in the Critics and Awards Program for High School Students (Cappies),, now called the Alberta Youth Theatre Collective, and has partnerships with a number of arts organizations in Edmonton, including the Edmonton Symphony Orchestra and the Alberta Ballet Company. It also supports community events such as the Canspell National Spelling Bee.

The Journal has also begun operating under a new commitment to digital media in addition to traditional print.

 Circulation 
The Edmonton Journal has seen like most Canadian daily newspapers a decline in circulation. Its total circulation dropped by  percent to 92,542 copies daily from 2009 to 2015.Daily average'

See also

List of newspapers in Canada

References

External links
 
 Historical
 Columnists
  Blogs
 

Newspapers published in Edmonton
Publications established in 1903
Daily newspapers published in Alberta